Max Freiherr von Waldberg (January 1, 1858 — November 6, 1938) was a professor of modern literature at the University of Heidelberg in Germany. After World War I, one of his students was Joseph Goebbels, later the Nazi's propaganda minister. Nevertheless, because of his Jewish ancestry, von Waldberg was one of several Heidelberg professors forced to retire in April 1933, when the Third Reich passed a Civil Service Law to remove university faculty members of "non-Aryan" descent.

References

1858 births
1938 deaths
Academic staff of Heidelberg University
19th-century German Jews
Barons of Germany
University of Vienna alumni